The Fritz Pflaum Hut is an Alpine club hut belonging to the Bayerland Section of the German Alpine Club, located in the Kaisergebirge mountains in the Austrian federal state of Tyrol.

Location 
The Fritz Pflaum Hut is an unmanned climbers' hut high above the Kaiserbachtal that lies in the Griesner Cirque (Griesner Kar) at the foot of the Mitterkaiser. It is accessible with an Alpine Club key (AV-Schlüssel). The hut is a base for all summits around the Griesener Kar bowl as well as a starting point for the Kleinkaiser and Mitterkaiser peaks. It has 23 bedspaces.

Normally there is no caretaker at the hut.   A caretaker may be on hand for prearranged group bookings.

History 
The hut was named after the Alpinist, Fritz Pflaum, who was born in 1871. He was a keen nature lover and sportsman and loved the Wilder Kaiser. On 25 August 1908 he died during a difficult mountain tour on the Mönch. Relatives, friends and acquaintances donated 8,000 marks for the construction of the Fritz Pflaum Hut, which was opened on 25 August 1912, exactly four years after his death. Subsequent attempts to rename it the Griesnerkar Hut have not succeeded. An attempt to provide a basic managed service in the spring of 2007 failed because of a ban by the district commission.

Approaches 
The normal approach to the hut is from the Griesner Alm in the Kaiserbach valley over a good path with numerous bends that takes 2 hours as a mountain hike and 2 hours as a ski tour.

The alternative is a rarely used climb from the Fischbachalm, also down in the Kaiserbach valley, via the pine oil distillery (Latschenölbrennerei) and the Kleiner Griesner Tor which takes 2 hours. This route is rather more challenging and requires sure-footedness. Some sections are protected by cable.

Crossings 
 Gaudeamus Hut, via the Kleines Törl, Gildensteig and Wildererkanzel, duration: 3 hours
 Ackerl Hut, via the Kleines Törl, Gildensteig and Wilder Kaiser Path, duration: 3 hours
 Ackerl Hut, via the Ackerlspitze and Maukspitze, challenging, duration: 5 hours
 Grutten Hut, via the Kleines Törl, Gildensteig, Wilder Kaiser Path, Jubiläumssteig, duration: 4 hours
 Stripsenjochhaus, via the Großes Griesner Tor, Hüttenweg, easy, duration: 2 hours

Ascents 
The following ascents are listed by the DAV:
 Ackerlspitze, duration: 2 hours, medium difficulty
 Lärcheck, duration: 2¼ hours, difficult
 Mitterkaiser, duration: ½-1 hour, medium difficulty
 Regalmspitze, duration: 2 hours, difficult
 Maukspitze (_, duration of crossing: 1 hour, difficult

Pictures

References

Notes

Citations

External links 
 Bayerland Section of the DAV 
 The climbing garden (Klettergarten) at Fritz Pflaum Hut 

Mountain huts in Tyrol (state)